Haroun Kadamy Youssouf (born 11 April 1998), commonly known as Haroun Mohamed, is a Djiboutian footballer who plays as a midfielder for Belgian club La Louvière Centre and the Djibouti national team

Club career
In January 2020, Mohamed moved from ES Cesson VSD to CO Vincennes. By January 2021, he had moved on to La Louvière Centre in the Belgian National Division 1.

International career
Mohamed made his senior international debut on 7 December 2019, in a 2019 CECAFA Cup match against Somalia. Eight days later he scored his first international goal in the same tournament, Djibouti's only goal in a 4–1 defeat to Uganda. At the time, he was one of only two Djibouti internationals playing abroad, along with Warsama Hassan.

Career statistics

International

Scores and results list Djibouti's goal tally first, score column indicates score after each Mohamed goal.

References

External links
 

1998 births
Living people
Djiboutian footballers
Association football midfielders
SCM Râmnicu Vâlcea players
UR La Louvière Centre players
Belgian Third Division players
Djibouti international footballers
Djiboutian expatriate footballers
Djiboutian expatriate sportspeople in Romania
Djiboutian expatriate sportspeople in Austria
Djiboutian expatriate sportspeople in France
Djiboutian expatriate sportspeople in Belgium
Expatriate footballers in Romania
Expatriate footballers in Austria
Expatriate footballers in France
Expatriate footballers in Belgium